John C. Knapp is an American academic administrator serving as the 13th president of Washington & Jefferson College in Washington, Pennsylvania. Previously, he served as 12th president of Hope College, a private Christian liberal arts college located in Holland, Michigan.

Education 
In 1981, Knapp earned a Bachelor of Science degree in urban life with a concentration in communication from Georgia State University. Following his bachelor's degree, he completed his Master of Arts degree in theological studies at Columbia Theological Seminary in 1995. In 1999, Knapp earned a Doctor of Philosophy degree in theology and religious studies at the University of Wales. At the time, he was an Honorary Visiting Lecturer at the university. He was awarded the honorary Doctor of Letters (D.Litt.) degree by Hope College in 2013.

Career

Research and writing 
Knapp has published five books titled For the Common Good: The Ethics of Leadership in the 21st Century (Praeger, 2006); Leaders on Ethics: Real-World Perspectives on Today's Business Challenges (Praeger, 2007); The Business of Higher Education (ABC-CLIO, 2009), three volumes focusing on how universities cope with pressure to strengthen accountability and efficiency; and How the Church Fails Businesspeople (and What Can Be Done About It) (William B. Eerdmans Publishing Company, 2011), which provides insight regarding the relationship between faith and work. His latest book is Ghostwriting and The Ethics of Authenticity (Palgrave Macmillan, 2016), an exploration of the ethics, history and practice of ghostwriting in a wide range of practical contexts.

Academic positions 
Knapp served as founding director of Samford University’s Frances Marlin Mann Center for Ethics and Leadership. While there, he held the Mann Family Professorship in Ethics and Leadership. Prior to his tenure at Samford, Dr. Knapp taught at Georgia State University as a Professor and served as founding Director of the Center for Ethics and Corporate Responsibility at the J. Mack Robinson College of Business, as well as its predecessor The Southern Institute for Business & Professional Ethics. He was inducted into Omicron Delta Kappa at Samford in 2010.

Knapp previously taught courses in the doctoral program at Columbia Theological Seminary and was a Senior Scholar and Professor of Ethical Leadership at Kennesaw State University. He serves on the boards of organizations including American Association of Presidents of Independent Colleges and Universities, Presidents Athletic Conference, Pennsylvania Consortium for the Liberal Arts, and Robert J. Rutland Institute for Ethics at Clemson University. He is a fellow of Caux Round Table and is a past board member of Great Lakes Colleges Association, Michigan Intercollegiate Athletic Association, Van Andel Institute, Georgia Humanities Council; Alabama Humanities Foundation; Atlanta Convention and Visitors Bureau; Public Relations Society of America, Georgia Chapter; and Society for Human Resource Management, Atlanta. In 2018 and 2019 he chaired The New York Times Presidents Council, a representative group of leaders of independent colleges that meets annually with editors and reporters to discuss current issues in higher education.

Knapp is co-founder and director of the Oxford Conclave on Global Higher Education, a retreat for college and university presidents held annually since 2004 at the University of Oxford. In 2022, the University of Wales Trinity St. David's bicentenary celebration featured him among 200 outstanding graduates and institutional leaders of the university's first 200 years. He was recognized with the 2001 Georgia Governor's Award in the Humanities, the 2013 Birmingham Urban League Multi-Racial Friendship Award, and induction into the Martin Luther King, Jr. International Collegium of Scholar at Morehouse College. In 1993, he was named one of the "10 Outstanding Young People of Atlanta" and in 1992 Business Atlanta recognized him as one of the region's "40 Under 40" young leaders.

Knapp was appointed president of Hope College on July 1, 2013. In addition to his presidential appointment, Knapp was also a Professor of Religion and Professor of Management. On April 21, 2017, Knapp was announced as the 13th President of Washington & Jefferson College in Washington, Pennsylvania, where he also holds an appointment as Professor in the Department of Philosophy. He officially began his duties on August 1, 2017.

References

External links
https://web.archive.org/web/20150617165849/http://hope.edu/president/biography
http://hope.edu/president
http://www.hope.edu/2013/03/25/john-c-knapp-named-12th-president-hope-college
http://www.al.com/living/index.ssf/2013/03/samford_university_professor_j.html
http://www.mlive.com/news/grand-rapids/index.ssf/2013/03/john_knapp_of_alabamas_samford.html

Hope College
Holland, Michigan
Living people
Washington & Jefferson College
Year of birth missing (living people)